The African Nuclear-Weapon-Free Zone Treaty, also known as the Treaty of Pelindaba (named after South Africa's main Nuclear Research Centre, run by The South African Nuclear Energy Corporation and was the location where South Africa's atomic bombs of the 1970s were developed, constructed and subsequently stored), establishes a Nuclear-Weapon-Free Zone in Africa. The treaty was signed in 1996 and came into effect with the 28th ratification on 15 July 2009.

Treaty outline
The Treaty prohibits the research, development, manufacture, stockpiling, acquisition, testing, possession, control or stationing of nuclear explosive devices in the territory of parties to the Treaty and the dumping of radioactive wastes in the African zone by Treaty parties. The Treaty also prohibits any attack against nuclear installations in the zone by Treaty parties and requires them to maintain the highest standards of physical protection of nuclear material, facilities and equipment, which are to be used exclusively for peaceful purposes. The Treaty requires all parties to apply full-scope International Atomic Energy Agency safeguards to all their peaceful nuclear activities. A mechanism to verify compliance, including the establishment of the African Commission on Nuclear Energy, has been established by the Treaty. Its office will be in South Africa. The Treaty affirms the right of each party to decide for itself whether to allow visits by foreign ships and aircraft to its ports and airfields, explicitly upholds the freedom of navigation on the high seas and does not affect rights to passage through territorial waters guaranteed by international law.

Area of application
"African nuclear-weapon-free zone" means the territory of the continent of Africa, island states that are members of OAU, and all islands considered by the Organization of African Unity in its resolutions to be part of Africa; "Territory" means the land territory, internal waters, territorial seas and archipelagic waters and the airspace above them as well as the seabed and subsoil beneath.

The African Nuclear-Weapon-Free Zone (ANWFZ) covers the entire African continent as well as the following islands: Agaléga Islands, Bassas da India, Cabo Verde, Canary Islands, Cargados Carajos, Chagos Archipelago - Diego Garcia, Comoros, Europa Island, Juan de Nova, Madagascar, Mauritius, Mayotte, Prince Edward & Marion Islands, São Tomé and Príncipe, Réunion, Rodrigues Island, Seychelles, Tromelin Island, and Zanzibar and Pemba Islands.

This list does not mention the mid-ocean islands of St. Helena 1,900 km west from southern Angola or its dependencies including Ascension Island and Tristan da Cunha, Bouvet Island 2,500 km southwest from Cape Town, the Crozet Islands 2,350 km south of Madagascar, Kerguelen, or Île Amsterdam and Île Saint-Paul, which, (with American Samoa in the Pacific Ocean), are the only Southern Hemisphere lands not in any of the Nuclear-Weapon-Free Zones.

History

The quest for a nuclear free Africa began when the Organization of African Unity formally stated its desire for a Treaty ensuring the denuclearization of Africa at its first Summit in Cairo in July 1964. The Treaty was opened for signature on 11 April 1996 in Cairo, Egypt. All the States of Africa are eligible to become parties to the Treaty, which will enter into force upon its 28th ratification; the Protocols with also come into force at that time for those Protocol signatories that have deposited their instruments of ratification. It was reported in 1996 that no African Arab state would ratify the Treaty until Israel renounces its nuclear weapons program. However, Algeria, Libya, and Mauritania have since ratified the Treaty.

The United Nations General Assembly has passed without a vote identical resolutions in 1997 (twice), 1999, 2001, 2003, and 2005 calling upon African States that have not yet done so to sign and ratify the Treaty as soon as possible so that it may enter into force without delay, and for States contemplated in Protocol III to take all necessary measures to ensure its speedy application.  A resolution had been passed in 1995 in support of the final text of the Treaty.

Ratified or acceded states

As of May 2022, the Treaty has been ratified by 43 states and the Sahrawi Arab Republic, and entered into force on 15 July 2009.

States that have signed but not ratified
All countries are members of the African Union

Non-signatory states

Nuclear weapons states and the African Nuclear Weapon Free Zone

The Treaty has three Protocols.

Under Protocol I, the United States, France, the United Kingdom, Russia and the People's Republic of China are invited to agree not to use or threaten to use a nuclear explosive device against any Treaty party or against any territory of a Protocol III party within the African zone.

Under Protocol II, the United States, France, the United Kingdom, the Russian Federation and China are invited to agree not to test or assist or encourage the testing of a nuclear explosive device anywhere within the African zone.

Protocol III is open to states with dependent territories in the zone and obligates them to observe certain provisions of the Treaty with respect to these territories; only Spain and France may become Parties to it.

The United Kingdom, France, the Russian Federation and China have signed and ratified the Protocols, but the United States has yet to ratify. Spain has neither signed nor ratified Protocol III.

The United States has supported the concept of the denuclearization of Africa since the first United Nations General Assembly resolution on this issue in 1965 and has played an active role in drafting the final text of the Treaty and Protocols. The United States signed Protocols I and II in 1996, but has not ratified them.  In May 2010, U.S. Secretary of State Hillary Clinton announced that the Obama Administration would submit these protocols to the U.S. Senate for advice and consent to ratification.

The status of the Indian Ocean island of Diego Garcia, controlled by the United Kingdom and used as a military base by the United States, with regard to the Treaty is unclear. Diego Garcia is part of the Chagos Archipelago claimed by Mauritius. The other islands of the Chagos Archipelago are considered in Africa and are under the treaty, but neither the United States nor the United Kingdom recognizes Diego Garcia as being subject to the Treaty.

Enforcement
To allow for the verification of its nuclear non-proliferation undertaking, the Treaty requires parties to conclude comprehensive safeguards agreements with the IAEA equivalent to the agreements required in connection with the Treaty on the Non-Proliferation of Nuclear Weapons (NPT). Twenty-one States in Africa have yet to bring such agreements into force. The IAEA encourages them to bring these agreements into force as soon as possible.

According to Article 12 (Mechanism for compliance) of the Treaty, after entry-into-force, the Parties agree to establish an African Commission on Nuclear Energy (AFCONE). In addition to being a compliance mechanism, the Commission will be responsible for encouraging regional and sub-regional programmes for co-operation in the peaceful uses of nuclear science and technology. The establishment of AFCONE would also: encourage African states to take responsibility for their natural resources, and in particular nuclear material; and protect against the dumping of toxic waste.

References

External links
 Text of African Nuclear Weapons Free Zone Treaty
 African Nuclear Weapons Free Zone Treaty, United States Department of State
 African Nuclear Weapon Free Zone Treaty, Nuclear Threat Initiative

1996 in Egypt
African Union treaties
Treaties establishing nuclear-weapon-free zones
Treaties concluded in 1996
Treaties entered into force in 2009
Treaties of Algeria
Treaties of Angola
Treaties of Benin
Treaties of Botswana
Treaties of Burkina Faso
Treaties of Burundi
Treaties of Cameroon
Treaties of Chad
Treaties of the Comoros
Treaties of the Republic of the Congo
Treaties of Ivory Coast
Treaties of Equatorial Guinea
Treaties of Ethiopia
Treaties of Gabon
Treaties of the Gambia
Treaties of Ghana
Treaties of Guinea
Treaties of Guinea-Bissau
Treaties of Kenya
Treaties of Lesotho
Treaties of the Libyan Arab Jamahiriya
Treaties of Madagascar
Treaties of Malawi
Treaties of Mali
Treaties of Mauritania
Treaties of Mauritius
Treaties of Mozambique
Treaties of Namibia
Treaties of Nigeria
Treaties of Rwanda
Treaties of the Sahrawi Arab Democratic Republic
Treaties of Senegal
Treaties of Seychelles
Treaties of South Africa
Treaties of Eswatini
Treaties of Tanzania
Treaties of Togo
Treaties of Tunisia
Treaties of Zambia
Treaties of Zimbabwe